"Crazy" is a song recorded by American recording artists Lumidee and Pitbull for Lumidee's second album, Unexpected (2007). It was written by Lumidee, Pitbull and Steven "Lenky" Marsden and produced by the latter. It was released as the second single on July 24, 2007 by TVT Records.

Music video
The music video for this song was directed by Dale Resteghini.

Track listing
Germany Crazy - EP
"Crazy" – 3:04
"Crazy" (Club Mix) – 3:56
"Crazy" (Instrumental) – 3:04
"He Told Me" – 3:09

Charts

Weekly charts

Release history

References

2007 singles
Lumidee songs
Songs written by Lumidee
Pitbull (rapper) songs
Songs written by Pitbull (rapper)
Songs written by Steven "Lenky" Marsden
Song recordings produced by Steven "Lenky" Marsden
TVT Records singles
2007 songs
Music videos directed by Dale Resteghini